Lumberton is a township in Burlington County, in the U.S. state of New Jersey. It is part of the Delaware Valley / Philadelphia metropolitan area. As of the 2020 United States census, the township's population was 12,803, an increase of 244 (+1.9%) from the 2010 census count of 12,559, which in turn reflected an increase of 2,098 (+20.1%) from the 10,461 counted at the 2000 census.

Lumberton was incorporated as a township by an act of the New Jersey Legislature on March 14, 1860, from portions of Medford Township, Southampton Township and Eastampton Township. Portions of the township were taken on March 12, 1924, to form Hainesport Township. The township was named for its early lumber industry, with pine trees cut down to supply wood used in Philadelphia.

In March 2007, Lumberton was identified as having the most active community of eBay buyers and sellers on a per-capita basis in the United States, with 46,000 items posted on the site over a three-week period by members based in the Lumberton ZIP code 08048.

History
The earliest inhabitants of the area were the Lenape Native Americans. In the 17th century, European settlers cleared wooded areas and established farms in the township's southwest region that revolved around the unincorporated community of Fostertown. The village of Lumberton grew out of two bordering towns. Eayrestown was settled by Richard and Elizabeth Eayres in the late 1600s. Eayrestown was the first substantial settlement in this area and became the center of commerce because of its sawmill. The history of some of the homes in Lumberton dates back to the times of slavery. Each generation of descendants removed from the first settlers differed in opinion about slavery. The spectrum changed from advocacy and tolerance to passive and active resistance. Many locals began to advocate for its abolition in New Jersey, then nationwide. One home, still located on Creek Road in the township, has been documented as having been a site on the underground railroad. The home was originally built in 1824 by D.B. Cole, a descendant of the founders of old Colestown, New Jersey. The deed to the home's land dates back to 1806, when the Coles purchased the land from the Moores of Moorestown. The story goes and has been documented in Charles Blockson's Hippocrene Guide to the Underground Railroad, that a fake well that once rested in the backyard of the house served as a chute for enslaved people to slide down in order to hide from their slavemasters as they fled to Canada.

The town was a site for Project Nike during the Cold War. In the event of a nuclear war, Nike Ajax and Hercules missiles were to be launched from bases in Lumberton and other neighboring bases in order to prevent the Soviet Union from bombing greater Philadelphia.

Geography
According to the United States Census Bureau, the township had a total area of 13.01 square miles (33.71 km2), including 12.88 square miles (33.37 km2) of land and 0.13 square miles (0.34 km2) of water (1.01%).

The township borders the Burlington County municipalities of Eastampton, Hainesport, Medford, Mount Holly, Mount Laurel, and Southampton.

Unincorporated communities, localities and place names located partially or completely within the township include Brown, Eayrestown, Fostertown and Newbolds Corner.

Demographics

2010 census

The Census Bureau's 2006–2010 American Community Survey showed that (in 2010 inflation-adjusted dollars) median household income was $82,250 (with a margin of error of +/− $10,344) and the median family income was $102,276 (+/− $7,854). Males had a median income of $71,475 (+/− $6,369) versus $54,452 (+/− $5,969) for females. The per capita income for the borough was $35,294 (+/− $1,882). About 5.6% of families and 5.0% of the population were below the poverty line, including 6.3% of those under age 18 and 1.3% of those age 65 or over.

2000 census
As of the 2000 United States census there were 10,461 people, 3,930 households, and 2,731 families residing in the township. The racial makeup of the township was 78.31% White, 13.75% African American, 0.23% Native American, 3.38% Asian, 0.02% Pacific Islander, 1.90% from other races, and 2.41% from two or more races. Hispanic or Latino of any race were 5.15% of the population.

There were 3,930 households, out of which 39.2% had children under the age of 18 living with them, 54.9% were married couples living together, 10.9% had a female householder with no husband present, and 30.5% were non-families. 25.1% of all households were made up of individuals, and 9.1% had someone living alone who was 65 years of age or older. The average household size was 2.61 and the average family size was 3.17.

In the township the population was spread out, with 28.1% under the age of 18, 6.2% from 18 to 24, 35.6% from 25 to 44, 19.0% from 45 to 64, and 11.1% who were 65 years of age or older.  The median age was 36 years. For every 100 females, there were 91.2 males.  For every 100 females age 18 and over, there were 87.6 males.

The median income for a household in the township was $60,571, and the median income for a family was $70,329. Males had a median income of $46,045 versus $32,431 for females. The per capita income for the township was $25,789.  About 2.6% of families and 3.8% of the population were below the poverty line, including 3.2% of those under age 18 and 5.9% of those age 65 or over.

Government

Local government 
Lumberton is governed under the Township form of New Jersey municipal government, one of 141 (of the 564) municipalities statewide that use this form, the second-most commonly used form of government in the state. The Township Committee is comprised of five members, who are elected directly by the voters at-large in partisan elections to serve three-year terms of office on a staggered basis, with either one or two seats coming up for election each year as part of the November general election in a three-year cycle. At an annual reorganization meeting, the Township Committee selects one of its members to serve as Mayor and another as Deputy Mayor.

, members of the Lumberton Township Committee are Mayor Terrance Benson and Deputy Mayor Gina LaPlaca (D, terms on committee end December 31, 2023; term as mayor ends 2023), Lori Faye (D, term ends December 31, 2025 Kendra Hatfield (D, 2024) and Robert Rodriguez (D, 2024).

In 2020 Gina LaPlaca and Terrance Benson were elected to township committee, giving Democrats a 5-0 majority for the first time in Lumberton history. LaPlaca and Benson received a record number of votes for a municipal candidate.

Federal, state and county representation 
Lumberton is located in the 3rd Congressional District and is part of New Jersey's 8th state legislative district.

 

Burlington County is governed by a Board of County Commissioners comprised of five members who are chosen at-large in partisan elections to serve three-year terms of office on a staggered basis, with either one or two seats coming up for election each year; at an annual reorganization meeting, the board selects a director and deputy director from among its members to serve a one-year term. , Burlington County's Commissioners are
Director Felicia Hopson (D, Willingboro Township, term as commissioner ends December 31, 2024; term as director ends 2023),
Deputy Director Tom Pullion (D, Edgewater Park, term as commissioner and as deputy director ends 2023),
Allison Eckel (D, Medford, 2025),
Daniel J. O'Connell (D, Delran Township, 2024) and 
Balvir Singh (D, Burlington Township, 2023). 
Burlington County's Constitutional Officers are
County Clerk Joanne Schwartz (R, Southampton Township, 2023)
Sheriff James H. Kostoplis (D, Bordentown, 2025) and 
Surrogate Brian J. Carlin (D, Burlington Township, 2026).

Politics
As of March 2011, there were a total of 7,481 registered voters in Lumberton, of which 2,406 (32.2% vs. 33.3% countywide) were registered as Democrats, 1,827 (24.4% vs. 23.9%) were registered as Republicans and 3,241 (43.3% vs. 42.8%) were registered as Unaffiliated. There were 7 voters registered as Libertarians or Greens. Among the township's 2010 Census population, 59.6% (vs. 61.7% in Burlington County) were registered to vote, including 82.1% of those ages 18 and over (vs. 80.3% countywide).

In the 2012 presidential election, Democrat Barack Obama received 3,508 votes here (57.4% vs. 58.1% countywide), ahead of Republican Mitt Romney with 2,504 votes (41.0% vs. 40.2%) and other candidates with 53 votes (0.9% vs. 1.0%), among the 6,108 ballots cast by the township's 7,956 registered voters, for a turnout of 76.8% (vs. 74.5% in Burlington County). In the 2008 presidential election, Democrat Barack Obama received 3,756 votes here (59.5% vs. 58.4% countywide), ahead of Republican John McCain with 2,476 votes (39.2% vs. 39.9%) and other candidates with 53 votes (0.8% vs. 1.0%), among the 6,315 ballots cast by the township's 7,661 registered voters, for a turnout of 82.4% (vs. 80.0% in Burlington County). In the 2004 presidential election, Democrat John Kerry received 2,924 votes here (52.1% vs. 52.9% countywide), ahead of Republican George W. Bush with 2,637 votes (46.9% vs. 46.0%) and other candidates with 42 votes (0.7% vs. 0.8%), among the 5,617 ballots cast by the township's 6,832 registered voters, for a turnout of 82.2% (vs. 78.8% in the whole county).

In the 2013 gubernatorial election, Republican Chris Christie received 2,173 votes here (62.2% vs. 61.4% countywide), ahead of Democrat Barbara Buono with 1,235 votes (35.4% vs. 35.8%) and other candidates with 41 votes (1.2% vs. 1.2%), among the 3,493 ballots cast by the township's 7,917 registered voters, yielding a 44.1% turnout (vs. 44.5% in the county). In the 2009 gubernatorial election, Republican Chris Christie received 1,847 votes here (49.6% vs. 47.7% countywide), ahead of Democrat Jon Corzine with 1,650 votes (44.3% vs. 44.5%), Independent Chris Daggett with 174 votes (4.7% vs. 4.8%) and other candidates with 32 votes (0.9% vs. 1.2%), among the 3,724 ballots cast by the township's 7,656 registered voters, yielding a 48.6% turnout (vs. 44.9% in the county).

Education 
For pre-kindergarten through eighth grade, public school students attend the Lumberton Township School District. As of the 2021–22 school year, the district, comprised of three schools, had an enrollment of 1,141 students and 96.8 classroom teachers (on an FTE basis), for a student–teacher ratio of 11.8:1. Schools in the district (with 2021–22 enrollment data from the National Center for Education Statistics) are 
Ashbrook Elementary School with 398 students in grades PreK-2, 
Bobby's Run School with 328 students in grades 3-5 and 
Lumberton Middle School with 378 students in grades 6-8. In 2018, the district decided to close the Florence L. Walther School, which had served students in Kindergarten and first grade, at the end of the 2019-20 school year and reconfigure the grades assigned to the three remaining facilities.

As of the 2021–22 school year, the high school had an enrollment of 2,048 students and 140.3 classroom teachers (on an FTE basis), for a student–teacher ratio of 14.6:1. The school is located in Mount Holly Township. The high school district's board of education has nine members who are elected directly by voters to serve three-year terms of office on a staggered basis, with three seats up for election each year as part of the November general election. Seats on the board are allocated based on the population of the five constituent municipalities, with three seats assigned to Lumberton Township.

Students from Lumberton Township, and from all of Burlington County, are eligible to attend the Burlington County Institute of Technology, a countywide public school district that serves the vocational and technical education needs of students at the high school and post-secondary level at its campuses in Medford and Westampton.

Transportation

Roads and highways

Route 38 is the main east–west highway and County Route 541 is the main north–south road through the township.

Public transportation
NJ Transit provides bus service in Lumberton on the 317 route between Asbury Park and Philadelphia, and on the 413 route between Camden and Burlington.

BurLink bus service is offered on the B1 route between Beverly and Pemberton.

Airport

Notable people

People who were born in, residents of, or otherwise closely associated with Lumberton include:

 Pat Delany, former mayor of Lumberton who served in the New Jersey General Assembly from 2010 until his resignation in 2011 after disclosure that his wife had sent emails critical of Democratic candidate Carl Lewis
 Ryan Finley (born 1991), professional soccer player who plays as a forward for the Columbus Crew in Major League Soccer
 Eric Lofton (born 1993), offensive lineman for the Edmonton Football Team of the Canadian Football League
 Jack Pierce (born 1962), Olympic bronze medalist in the 100-meter high hurdles at the 1992 Olympic Games.
 Clifford Ross Powell (1893–1973), politician who served as Acting Governor of New Jersey in 1935
 Bobby Sanguinetti (born 1988), professional ice hockey defenseman who plays for HC Lugano in the National League

References

External links

Lumberton Township website
Lumberton Historical Society
Lumberton Township School District

Data for the Lumberton Township School District, National Center for Education Statistics
Former Lumberton Nike Missile Site

 
1860 establishments in New Jersey
Populated places established in 1860
Township form of New Jersey government
Townships in Burlington County, New Jersey